Kulchurovo (Qolsora) is a rural locality (a selo) and the administrative centre of Kulchurovsky Selsoviet, Baymaksky District, Bashkortostan, Russia. The population was 429 as of 2010. There are 5 streets.

Geography 
Kulchurovo is located 57 km north of Baymak (the district's administrative centre) by road. Nizhneidrisovo is the nearest rural locality.

References 

Rural localities in Baymaksky District